Roy Rodwell (9 November 1908 – 8 March 1979) was  a former Australian rules footballer who played with Footscray in the Victorian Football League (VFL).

Notes

External links 
		

1908 births
1979 deaths
Australian rules footballers from Victoria (Australia)
Western Bulldogs players
Oakleigh Football Club players